Bentinck Township is a township in Bottineau County in the U.S. state of North Dakota. Its population during the 2000 Census was 32, and an estimated 29 people as of 2009.

History
Bentinck Township was organized in 1905.

Geography
Bentinck Township is located in the western part of Bottineau County in survey township T162 North, Range 81 West. The nearest cities are Westhope to the northeast and Maxbass to the south.

Demographics
The 2000 Census reported there were 32 people, 12 households, and 11 families residing in the township. The racial makeup of the township was 100% White. Norwegian was the largest ancestry group in the township, at 48.6%.

Of the 12 households in the township, only 16.7% had children under the age of 18 living with them. married couples made up 91.7% of the population. Just one household (8.3%) was a non-family household. The average household size was 2.67 people.

84% of the township was under the age of 65 at the 2000 Census, with children under the age of 18 making up 20% of the population. The largest group was 45- to 64-year-olds, with 40.6%, followed by 25- to 44-year-olds (18.8%) and those over 65 (15.6%). Just 3.1% of the population was made up of 18- to 24-year-olds. The median age was 48 years.

The median household income for the township was $46,250, and the median family income was $52,500. Males had a median income of $56,250 versus $13,750 for females, with a per capita income of $16,938.

References

External links
 U.S. Census map of Bentinck Township as of the 2000 Census

Townships in Bottineau County, North Dakota
Populated places established in 1905
1905 establishments in North Dakota
Townships in North Dakota